Port 80 may refer to: 

 TCP port 80, most often used by Hypertext Transfer Protocol
 I/O port 80 in IBM PCs, used by POST error reporting